Stephen E. Harding (born 2 August 1955) is a British biochemist specialising in biomolecular hydrodynamics. Harding is currently Professor of Applied Biochemistry at the University of Nottingham, has been the Director of the National Centre of Macromolecular Hydrodynamics since its foundation in 1987 and is a member of the Centre for the Study of the Viking Age.

Besides developing and applying hydrodynamic methodology to biomolecules, Harding's notable work includes finding remarkable protein-like behaviour of carbohydrates and the discovery of high levels of Scandinavian genes in the ancestral population of coastal North West England. He is now part of the Saving Oseberg research team - finding natural polymer consolidants to replace the decayed cellulose and lignin in all the perilously fragile artefacts of the Oseberg Viking ship and in August 2017 appointed an adjunct Professor of the University of Oslo.

In 1991 he became a junior medallist of the Royal Society of Chemistry and in 2002 awarded a DSc from the University of Oxford. For his scientific and historical investigation of the Vikings in North West England, where he hails from, he was, in 2011, made a Knight of the 1st class of the Royal Norwegian Order of Merit by King Harald of Norway for his "outstanding service in the interests of Norway". He gave the 2016 Hakon Hakonsson Lecture at Largs, and the 2017 Svedberg lecture.

Works

Papers

Heinze, Thomas; Nikolajski, Melanie; Daus, Stephan, Besong, Tabot M.D., Michaelis, Nico; Berlin, Peter; Morris, Gordon A.; Rowe, Arthur J.; Harding, Stephen E. (2011) "Protein‐like Oligomerization of Carbohydrates", Angewandte Chemie International Edition. 50(37): 8602-8604.
Harding, Stephen E. (2018) "The Svedberg Lecture 2017. From nano to micro: the huge dynamic range of the analytical ultracentrifuge for characterising the sizes, shapes and interactions of molecules and assemblies in Biochemistry and Polymer Science", European Biophysics Journal. 47(7): 697-707
Wakefield, Jennifer M.K.; Gillis, Richard B.; Adams, Gary G.; McQueen, Caitlin, M.A.; Harding, Stephen E. (2018) "Controlled depolymerisation assessed by analytical ultracentrifugation of low molecular weight chitosan for use in archaeological conservation". European Biophysics Journal. 47(7): 769–775
Full list of publications: Google Scholar

Books

Harding, Stephen (2017). Science and the Vikings. The Hakon Hakonsson Lecture, 2016. Largs & District Historical Society. .
Harding, Stephen; Tombs, Michael P.; Adams, Gary G.; Paulsen,  Berit Smestad; Inngjerdingen, Kari Tvete; Barsett, Hilde (2017) An Introduction to Polysaccharide Biotechnology. 2nd Edition. CRC Press. .
Full list of books: Amazon.co.uk

References

External links
 Stephen Harding at the School of Biosciences, The University of Nottingham
 Stephen Harding at the Centre for the Study of the Viking Age
 National Centre of Macromolecular Hydrodynamics
 Stephen Harding at the University of Oslo

British biochemists
1955 births
Living people